Sport Boys Association, commonly referred to as Sport Boys or simply Boys, is a Peruvian football club based in the port city of Callao. It was founded on 28 July 1927. Its classic and historic rival is the Atlético Chalaco against whom dispute the Clasico Porteño derby of Callao. It is considered the fourth most important club in the history of Peruvian football as they have won 6 national titles and have the largest number of international appearances after Universitario, Sporting Cristal and Alianza Lima, teams of Lima.

History
The club was founded on July 28, 1927, by a group of young enthusiasts from El Callao who got together to fulfill the dream of a very important local football fan Gualberto Lizárraga to start a football club. The day before Peru's independence day, July 27, they held a meeting and at midnight, the group sang the National Anthem. Afterwards, they declared the club founded and named Lizárraga president and unanimously voted for the club name to be Sport Boys Association.

The team's original uniform was striped red and yellow.

Sport Boys was the first Peruvian football club to feature cheerleaders. Many of them, including Anelhí Arias, Shirley Cherres, and others that have become Peruvian celebrities.

Recent years
The last time Sport Boys became champions of the Primera División Peruana was 1984. Since then they have had a rollercoaster of ups and downs. Some of the ups have been being runners-up in the 1990 and 1991 First Division after having won the Segunda División Peruana to gain promotion. In 1999 the Sport Boys qualified for the Copa CONMEBOL, and in 2001 for the 2001 Copa Libertadores. Since then that team has had more downs than ups by avoiding relegation to the Segunda División Peruana by winning an end of season playoff match that went down to a penalty shootout against José Gálvez in the 2006 season. During 2008 their campaign was worse than the 2007 campaign leaving the Sport Boys in the bottom of the standings for most of the Apertura tournament. Financial issues were also haunting the club in 2008, so severe that they have not been able to pay their players from March 2008. Some players like midfielder Montenegro have had to do taxi work at night to be able to support their families. That year they were relegated to the Segunda División Peruana but on October 17, 2009, after a great season, Sport Boys went on to beat Cobresol 3–2 for the Segunda División Peruana finals to go back into the Primera Division Peruana, where it played for three seasons before been inundated with economical problems, and then finishing 15th during the 2012 season which relegated them back to the Peruvian Segunda Division

Kit evolution

Rivalries
Sport Boys has had a long-standing rivalry with Atlético Chalaco, Alianza Lima, Sporting Cristal, Deportivo Municipal, and Universitario.

Stadium

Sport Boys plays its home games at the Estadio Miguel Grau. It has a capacity of about 17,000. Before this stadium was built, they had to use the 5,000 spectator capacity Telmo Carbajo, a stadium that was in bad condition and unfit to host football matches. It was the first stadium in Callao. Sport Boys were forced to play their games in the Estadio Nacional, where they would be far away from their fans.

Honours

National

League
Peruvian Primera División:
Winners (6): 1935, 1937, 1942, 1951, 1958, 1984
Runner-up (9): 1938, 1950, 1952, 1959, 1960, 1966, 1976, 1990, 1991

Torneo Apertura:
Runner-up (2): 1998, 2000

Torneo Regional:
Winners (1): 1990-I
Runner-up (1): 1991-I

Peruvian Segunda División:
Winners (3): 1989, 2009, 2017

División Intermedia:
Runner-up (1): 1932

Performance in CONMEBOL competitions
Copa Libertadores: 6 appearances
1967: First round
1977: Quarter-finals
1985: Quarter-finals
1991: First round
1992: First round
2001: First round

Copa Sudamericana: 1 appearance
2022: First round

Copa CONMEBOL: 1 appearance
1999: Quarter-finals

Current squad

Technical staff

Teddy Cardama

Notable players

 Fernando Martinuzzi
 Cláudio Adão
 Armando "Tuta" Agurto
 Jorge "Campolo" Alcalde
 Teodoro "Prisco" Alcalde
 Gerónimo "Patrulla" Barbadillo
 Alfredo Carmona
 Jose Chacon
 Paolo de la Haza
 Carlos Flores
 Mario Flores
 Jorge Hirano
 Valeriano López
 Julio Meléndez
 Juan Jose Munante
 Oswaldo "Cachito" Ramírez
 Santiago Salazar
 Jhonny Vegas
 Waldemar Victorino
 Enrique Aróstegui

Managers

 Víctor Alcalde (1930s)
 Raúl Chappell (1940–42)
 Abelardo Robles (1943–44)
 Enrique Aróstegui (1945–46)
 Telmo Carbajo
 Miguel Rostaing
 José Arana (1948)
 Alfonso Huapaya (1950–52)
 Jorge Alcalde (1953)
 Dan Georgiadis (1957–58)
 Marcos Calderón (1958–62)
 José Gomes Nogueira (1964)
 José Chiarella (1966)
 Roberto Drago (1966)
 César Brush (1967)
 Diego Agurto (1968)
 José Chiarella (1969)
 Juan Honores (1970)
 Zózimo (1971)
 Juan Hohberg (1972)
 Djalma Santos (1973)
 Walter Milera (1973)
 Moisés Barack (1974)
 Diego Agurto (1974)
 Zózimo (1975–76)
 César Cubilla (1977)
 José Chiarella (1978)
 Luis Roth (1979)
 Eloy Campos (1979–80)
 José Chiarella (1980–81)
 Walter Milera (1983)
 Marcos Calderón (1984)
 Juan Hohberg (1985)
 Walter Milera (1986–87)
 Gustavo Merino (1987)
 Augusto Palacios (1987)
 Jaime Ramírez (1988)
 Vito Andrés "Sabino" Bártoli (1989)
 Miguel Ángel Arrué (1990)
 Miguel Company (1990)
 Fred (1990)
 Miguel Company (1991)
 Manuel Mayorga (1991)
 Edu (1992)
 Hernán Saavedra (1992)
 Manuel Mayorga (1992)
 Roberto Challe (1993)
 César Gonzales (1993–94)
 Luis Roth (1994)
 Carlos Solís (1994)
 Moisés Barack (1994)
 César González (1994)
 José Carlos Amaral (1995)
 Miguel Ángel Arrué (1996)
 Cláudio Adão (1997)
 César Cubilla (1997)
 César González (1998)
 Ivica Brzić (1999)
 César González (1999)
 Ramón Mifflin (2000)
 Teddy Cardama (2000)
 Ramón Mifflin (2001)
 César González (2001)
 Ramón Mifflin (2002)
 Jorge Sampaoli (2002–03)
 Fernando Zamácola (2004)
 Eusebio Salazar (2004)
 Franco Navarro (2004–05)
 Juan Carlos Cabanillas (2005)
 Eusebio Salazar (2005)
 Roberto Mosquera (2006)
 Raúl Márcovich (2006)
 César González (2006–07)
 Moisés Barack (2007)
 Jacinto Rodríguez (2008)
 Eusebio Salazar (July 2008–Dec 08)
 Juan Carlos Cabanillas (2009)
 Roberto Drago Maturo (Sept 2009–April 10)
 Miguel Company (April 2010–Dec 11)
 Agustín Castillo (2011)
 Claudio Techera (Jan 2012–July 12)
 Jorge Espejo (Sept 2012–13)
 Pablo Bossi (2013)
 Rivelino Carassa (2014)
 Paul Cominges (2014–15)
 Rivelino Carassa (2015–)
 Rainer Torres (2016)
 Mario Viera (2017)

References

External links

Official websites
 Official Website
 
 
 
Non-official websites
 Fan Website
 Fan Website
 Fan Website
 Fan Website
 Vamos Boys.com Fan Website

 
Football clubs in Peru
Association football clubs established in 1927